The Jones General Store and Esso Station is a historic Esso automotive service station and general store on Arkansas Highway 84 in Langley, Arkansas.  It is a single-story structure built out of fieldstone, with concrete door and window lintels.  The car porch extends in front of the building, supported by three fieldstone columns topped by simple capitals.  It was built in 1939, and served as the town's general store, operated by Johnny Jones, until the 1980s, when the store closed and the building was converted to residential use.  The building is locally significant in part for a circular millstone, used in the town's first gristmill, which is embedded in the wall near the eastern corner.

The property was listed on the National Register of Historic Places in 2000.

See also
 Murfreesboro Cities Service Station: Also in Pike County, Arkansas
 National Register of Historic Places listings in Pike County, Arkansas

References

Commercial buildings on the National Register of Historic Places in Arkansas
Buildings and structures completed in 1939
National Register of Historic Places in Pike County, Arkansas
Gas stations on the National Register of Historic Places in Arkansas
ExxonMobil buildings and structures